Escape to the Foreign Legion is a 1929 German silent film directed by Louis Ralph and starring Hans Stüwe, Alexander Murski, and Eva von Berne. Location shooting took place in Cueta in Spanish Morocco.

Cast

References

Bibliography

External links 
 

1929 films
Films of the Weimar Republic
Films directed by Louis Ralph
German silent feature films
German black-and-white films
Films about the French Foreign Legion
1920s German films
Films shot in Morocco